Løvøya is an island in Ormefjorden in Porsgrunn municipality, Norway.

On the island Morten Thrane Esmark found a black mineral which was sent to Swedish chemist Jöns Jakob Berzelius  for examination in 1828 for further analysis.  Berzelius determined that it contained a new element, which he named thorium after Thor, the Norse god of thunder.

References 

Islands of Vestfold og Telemark